Yuzhynets', also known as Jujinetz, Juźynetz, Iujineț, Jujenet, Juzynci, Juzynetz, Yuzhenitse or Yuzhenitsy, is a village in Chernivtsi Raion, in Chernivtsi Oblast, Ukraine. It belongs to Stavchany rural hromada, one of the hromadas of Ukraine.

Until 18 July 2020, Yuzhynets belonged to Kitsman Raion. The raion was abolished in July 2020 as part of the administrative reform of Ukraine, which reduced the number of raions of Chernivtsi Oblast to three. The area of Kitsman Raion was split between Chernivtsi Raion and Vyzhnytsia Raion, with Yuzhynets being transferred to Chernivtsi Raion.

Notable people
 Wilhelm Reich (1897-1957), psychoanalyst, lived there from the late 1890s (or early 1900s) till 1915, in the farm of his father, Leon Reich.

References

Villages in Chernivtsi Raion
Populated places established in 1560